The Ohio National Bank building is a historic structure in Downtown Columbus, Ohio. The Neoclassical building was designed by Richards, McCarty & Bulford, built in 1912, and largely remains as built. It was a long-term location for the Ohio National Bank. It was listed on the National Register of Historic Places in 1980, noted as one of the most significant examples of Greek Doric classical ornamentation in Columbus, with refined details throughout the building.

See also
 National Register of Historic Places listings in Columbus, Ohio

References

Bank buildings on the National Register of Historic Places in Ohio
Neoclassical architecture in Ohio
Commercial buildings completed in 1912
Buildings in downtown Columbus, Ohio
National Register of Historic Places in Columbus, Ohio
1912 establishments in Ohio
High Street (Columbus, Ohio)